This is a list of school districts in New York's Capital District. School districts in New York are publicly funded and are the most local government bodies in the state; school district budgets are the only budgets that state citizens have a direct impact on: budget votes take place on the third Tuesday in May annually. The Capital District's largest school district is Shenendehowa Central School District, with 9,734 students in the 2013-2014 school year. The smallest district is North Greenbush Common School District, with 19 students in its one-room schoolhouse during the 2013-2014 school year.

List

Note: This list incomplete. You can help expand it!

References

School districts in New York (state)
Education in Capital District (New York)